Rudolf Kröner (6 January 1942 – 16 December 2017) was a German football midfielder and later manager.

References

1942 births
2017 deaths
German footballers
SSV Reutlingen 05 players
Stuttgarter Kickers players
Hertha BSC players
1. FC Nürnberg players
Association football midfielders
Bundesliga players
German football managers
Stuttgarter Kickers managers
KSV Hessen Kassel managers
1. FC Kaiserslautern managers
1. FC Nürnberg managers